Cornelius Rector (June 15, 1892 – May, 1963), nicknamed "Broadway", was an American Negro league pitcher from the 1920s to the 1940s.

A native of Arkadelphia, Arkansas, Rector began playing professionally in local leagues in 1910. As a member of the Hilldale Club, he pitched against Babe Ruth in a 1920 exhibition, and continued to pitch effectively into his early fifties, finishing his 34-year playing career with the New York Black Yankees in 1944. Rector died in New York, New York in 1963 at age 70.

References

External links
 and Baseball-Reference Black Baseball stats and Seamheads
 Connie Rector at Arkansas Baseball Encyclopedia

1892 births
1963 deaths
Brooklyn Royal Giants players
Hilldale Club players
New York Black Yankees players
New York Cubans players
Lincoln Giants players
People from Arkadelphia, Arkansas
Baseball players from Arkansas
Baseball pitchers
20th-century African-American sportspeople